The Kia POP is an electric concept car presented by Kia Motors at the 2010 Paris Motor Show.

Overview

The Kia POP concept was developed by the South Korean brand's European Design Centre, located in Frankfurt, Germany and represents a vision of the future urban electric transport.

Design

Chrome-coloured, three-metre-long three-seater with an electric drive train, oblong-shaped side windows and front-hinged doors, the POP concept definitely shows a very different image of a car, which was the objective of the designers.

The design team says that to create the POP concept the inspiration was drawn from several different areas rather than the automotive world in order to break boundaries.

The POP has an interior purple colour that was chosen to express a calm and peaceful environment. It was inspired on a picture of a space shuttle.

Motor and battery

The Kia POP concept is powered by an electric engine with a power output of 50 kW and 190 Nm of torque.

Reference list

External links
 Kia Motors - home

Pop